The Pakistan Junior League (PJL) was a professional 20-over cricket league contested by Under-19 teams representing different cities of Pakistan. The league was soft-launched on 14 April 2022 by the Pakistan Cricket Board (PCB) Chairman, Ramiz Raja. The only installment was played from 6–21 October 2022, featuring six teams and 19 games, at Gaddafi Stadium, Lahore. Draft for the league was held on 8 Sep 2022, 24 foreign players from nine different countries were selected by teams along with 66 local players. It was the first international league to exclusively consist of junior cricketers. The league was dissolved in December 2022.

History

Conception 

Shortly after his promotion to the position of PCB Chairman in September 2021, Ramiz Raja outlined his plans to improve cricket in Pakistan. Highlighting that the board needed to facilitate the transformation of young cricketers into world-class players, he expressed the desire to introduce an 'Under-19 T20 World League'. Over the following months, further details of this vision were outlined and Raja described his aspiration to expand the already successful Pakistan Super League (PSL) into two additional versions tailored to youth cricket and women's cricket. At the 67th Board of Governors meeting in December 2021, Pakistan's Pathway Cricket Foundation was identified as an initiative that would look to nurture 100 young cricketers in preparation for the upcoming launch of an 'U-19 PSL'.

Launch 

On 14 April 2022, the PCB, through their official website, announced the launch of the PJL. The announcement was accompanied by a statement from Raja who confirmed the inaugural season would take place in October 2022. In addition, the PCB had initiated the process to secure title, category sponsorships, live streaming providers and franchise owners.
The competition was to be a city-based league with players selected through a draft system. The PCB planned to involve international age-group cricketers from various nations as well.

Dissolution 
The Pakistan Junior League was dissolved by the newly appointed PCB Management Committee on 31 December 2022. It was dissolved after the first edition had cost approximately 997 million and had earned returns of 190 million, causing losses of 4 million.

Teams 
On 30 August 2022, PCB announced the names of the six teams for the inaugural edition of the Pakistan Junior League, each representing one city of Pakistan. These names were different from those used by the teams of the Pakistan Super League. Although the PCB had initially had planned a franchise model similar to that of PSL, it decided to take up the ownership of the teams itself after the base price set up for the ownership of teams was not met by the bidders.

Results
The only champions were Bahawalpur Royals, who defeated Gwadar Sharks in the final.

Season results

Team results

 Notes
  = Winner; 
  = Runner-up;
 (x) = End of league games table position;

References

External links

 Pakistan Junior League details

Twenty20 cricket leagues
Cricket leagues in Pakistan
Professional cricket leagues
Professional sports leagues in Pakistan
2022 establishments in Pakistan